Ray Clarke (born 25 September 1952) is an English retired professional footballer who played in England for Tottenham Hotspur, Swindon Town, Mansfield Town, Brighton and Newcastle United, in the Netherlands for Sparta Rotterdam and Ajax Amsterdam, and in Belgium for Club Brugge.

Clarke was chief international scout for Scottish side Celtic. Clarke left the position in June 2009.

Clarke was appointed chief scout of Portsmouth in September 2009.

By September 2010, Clarke was working as a scout at Middlesbrough, renewing his ties with Gordon Strachan who was his boss during his time at Celtic.

On 7 September 2012, he was appointed Head Scout at Blackburn Rovers

Honors
AFC Ajax
Eredivisie: 1978-79
KNVB Cup: 1978-79

References

External links
 
 Club Brugge profile

1952 births
Living people
Footballers from Hackney Central
English footballers
Association football forwards
Tottenham Hotspur F.C. players
Swindon Town F.C. players
Mansfield Town F.C. players
Sparta Rotterdam players
AFC Ajax players
Club Brugge KV players
Brighton & Hove Albion F.C. players
Newcastle United F.C. players
English Football League players
Eredivisie players
Belgian Pro League players
English expatriate footballers
Expatriate footballers in Belgium
Expatriate footballers in the Netherlands
English expatriate sportspeople in Belgium
English expatriate sportspeople in the Netherlands
Blackburn Rovers F.C. non-playing staff
Celtic F.C. non-playing staff
Middlesbrough F.C. non-playing staff